Oleh Romanovych Luzhnyi (born 5 August 1968) is a Ukrainian former professional footballer who played as a right-back.

Club career
Luzhnyi is a product of the Karpaty sports school (coached by Yuriy Hdanskyi and Yuriy Dyachuk-Stavytskyi) and later studied at the Lviv State School of Physical Culture. He first played for Ukrainian clubs Torpedo Lutsk (1985–88) and SKA Karpaty Lviv (1988) in Soviet lower football leagues.

Dynamo Kyiv

Luzhnyi signed for Dynamo Kyiv in 1989 and became a regular at right-back, winning the domestic double in 1990 and seven consecutive Ukrainian league titles between 1993 and 1999. He was the captain of Dynamo Kyiv's Champions League sides that defeated FC Barcelona 3–0 at home and 4–0 away in the group stage of the 1997–98 season and eliminated holders Real Madrid 3–1 on aggregate in the quarter finals en route to the semi-finals in 1998–99.

Arsenal
Luzhnyi signed for English club Arsenal in the summer of 1999 after impressing manager Arsène Wenger in Kyiv's clashes with Arsenal in the Champions League. He was signed as cover for Lee Dixon, although he was unable to fully displace the England international. While never a regular starter with the Gunners (the young Cameroonian Lauren was signed a year later as Dixon's long-term replacement), Luzhnyi still played 110 matches in four years at the club, either at right-back or, less frequently, at centre-back, and even captained the team once in the League Cup. In the 2001–02 season he won a double (the FA Premier League and the FA Cup) with Arsenal. He contributed 18 league appearances as Arsenal won the 2001-02 FA Premier League. His last match for the Gunners was the 2003 FA Cup Final (which Arsenal won, beating Southampton 1–0), Luzhny's best performance for the club.

Wolverhampton Wanderers
Luzhnyi signed for newly promoted Wolverhampton Wanderers in the summer of 2003. He spent a single season there, but only made ten appearances for the side and was released by Wolves in the summer of 2004 following their relegation from the Premier League.

International career

On the international stage, Luzhnyi made his debut at the age of 20 for the Soviet Union in 1989, winning eight caps but missing the 1990 World Cup because of injury. After the Soviet Union's dissolution, Luzhnyi went on to play for Ukraine, playing 52 times for his country between 1992 and 2003, although his side never reached a tournament finals, losing three times in the play-offs.

Luzhnyi captained the national side a record 39 times and achieved immense personal recognition in his country. In December 2000 he was voted into the Ukrainian 'Team of the Century' according to a poll by The Ukrainsky Futbol weekly. Luzhnyi received the fourth biggest number of votes, behind only to Oleh Blokhin, Andriy Shevchenko and Anatoliy Demyanenko.

Managerial career
Luzhnyi had a brief spell at Latvian side FK Venta as player-coach in 2005, but left the club after it ran into financial problems. He has now retired from playing and in June 2006 became assistant coach at Dynamo Kyiv.

Luzhnyi was named interim manager of Dynamo Kyiv on 5 November 2007 after the resignation of Yozhef Sabo. He led the club to three league wins in three matches, including a 2–1 home victory against perennial rivals Shakhtar Donetsk, as well as into the semifinals of the Ukrainian Cup. However, during the same period Dynamo suffered heavy Champions League defeats away at Manchester United and Sporting Lisbon and at home to Roma.

On 8 December 2007, Dynamo Kyiv unveiled a new permanent manager, Yury Syomin, and a few days later it was announced that Luzhnyi would continue as an assistant coach under the new manager.

On 1 October 2010, he was again named as interim manager of Dynamo Kyiv after the resignation of Valery Gazzaev. The first match was lost 2–0 to Shakhtar Donetsk at Donbas Arena. After the 19th round match against PFC Sevastopol Luzhnyi informed the fans that he will not return after the winter break. He was replaced by Yury Syomin on 24 December 2010.

Personal life
Luzhnyi turned down the chance to coach in England in 2022 in order to fight for Ukraine after the Russian invasion.

Career statistics

Club

International

Honours
Arsenal
FA Community Shield: 1999, 2002
Premier League: 2001–02
FA Cup: 2003

Individual
Ukrainian Team of the Century (poll by Ukrainsky Futbol): 2000

Notes

References

External links

 
 

Ukrainian Team of the Century (poll by Ukrainsky Futbol)
 Profile on website Football Ukraine

1968 births
Living people
Sportspeople from Lviv
Soviet footballers
Ukrainian footballers
Association football fullbacks
Dual internationalists (football)
Soviet Union international footballers
Ukraine international footballers
Soviet Union under-21 international footballers
Soviet Top League players
Soviet First League players
Soviet Second League players
FA Cup Final players
Ukrainian Premier League players
Ukrainian First League players
Latvian Higher League players
Premier League players
FC Volyn Lutsk players
FC SKA-Karpaty Lviv players
FC Dynamo Kyiv players
FC Dynamo-2 Kyiv players
Arsenal F.C. players
Wolverhampton Wanderers F.C. players
FK Venta players
Ukrainian football managers
Ukrainian expatriate football managers
Expatriate football managers in Latvia
Latvian Higher League managers
Ukrainian Premier League managers
FK Venta managers
FC Dynamo Kyiv managers
SC Tavriya Simferopol managers
FC Karpaty Lviv managers
Ukrainian expatriate footballers
Ukrainian expatriate sportspeople in England
Expatriate footballers in England
Ukrainian expatriate sportspeople in Latvia
Expatriate footballers in Latvia